The 1987 Korea rugby union tour of Australia was a series of five matches played by the Korea national rugby union team in Australia in 1987. The Korea team lost all five of their five matches, including the international match against the Australia national rugby union team.

Matches 
Scores and results list Korea's points tally first.

Test matches

Australia

Notes:
 Anthony Herbert, Steve James & Brian Smith made their full international debuts for Australia in this match.

References

Rugby union tours of Australia
South Korea
1987 in Australian rugby union
1987 in South Korean sport
Rugby union in South Korea